A peanut butter cookie is a type of cookie that is distinguished for having peanut butter as a principal ingredient. The cookie originated in the United States, its development dating back to the 1910s.

History
George Washington Carver (1864–1943), an American agricultural extension educator, from Alabama's Tuskegee Institute, was the most well known promoter of the peanut as a replacement for the cotton crop, which had been heavily damaged by the boll weevil. He compiled 105 peanut recipes from various cookbooks, agricultural bulletins and other sources. In his 1925 research bulletin called How to Grow the Peanut and 105 Ways of Preparing it for Human Consumption, he included three recipes for peanut cookies calling for crushed or chopped peanuts.

It was not until the early 1930s that peanut butter was listed as an ingredient in the cookies.

Fork pressing and patterning

Early peanut butter cookies were either rolled thin and cut into shapes, or else they were dropped and made into balls; they did not have fork marks. The first reference to the famous criss-cross marks created with fork tines was published in the Schenectady Gazette on July 1, 1932. The Peanut Butter Cookies recipe said: "[s]hape into balls and after placing them on the cookie sheet, press each one down with a fork, first one way and then the other, so they look like squares on waffles."

Pillsbury, one of the large flour producers, popularized the use of a fork in the 1930s. The Peanut Butter Balls recipe in the 1933 edition of Pillsbury's Balanced Recipes instructed the cook to press the cookies using fork tines. These early recipes do not explain why the advice is given to use a fork, though. The reason is that peanut butter cookie dough is dense, and unpressed, each cookie will not cook evenly. Using a fork to press the dough is a convenience of tool; bakers can also use a cookie shovel (spatula).

See also
Peanut butter blossom cookie (peanut butter cookie with Hershey's kiss in center)
List of cookies
 List of peanut dishes

References

 Cooks.com's Peanut Butter Cookie Recipes - A wide assortment of recipes
George Washington Carver. "How to Grow the Peanut and 105 Ways of Preparing it for Human Consumption," Tuskegee Institute Experimental Station Bulletin 31, 1916.
Andrew F. Smith, Peanuts: The Illustrious History of the Goober Pea Chicago, University of Illinois Press, 2002.
 Easiest Flourless Peanut Butter Cookie Recipe

Cookies
Peanut butter confectionery
American desserts